WR Draw is an out-of-service railroad bridge crossing the Passaic River between Newark and the Arlington section of Kearny, New Jersey. Last used for regular passenger service in 2002, it is welded in closed position as its height is not considered a hazard to navigation.

Rail service across the river was generally oriented to bringing passengers and freight from the points west over the Hackensack Meadows to Bergen Hill, where tunnels and cuts provided access terminals on the Hudson River.

History 
An alignment crossing the river at Arlington and North Newark was part of a grander scheme developed in the 1860s by the New York, Oswego, and Midland Railroad to run lines from Jersey City into northern New Jersey and beyond to Western New York, also opening up new areas for suburban development (including Belleville, just north of the current bridge's western end). Originally, the plan called for incorporating the Montclair Railway which had been established in 1867. Ultimately that plan was scuttled as a route was established farther north connecting to the New Jersey Midland Railway and Hudson Connecting Railway.

Nonetheless, expansion on the Montclair Railway continued and a right-of-way (ROW) over the river was established circa 1872-1874, The WR Draw's predecessor was known as the Midland Bridge, a name recalled in Midland Avenue which descends from Passaic Street to the former West Arlington Station. The line ran between Sterling Forest at the New York state line to Croxton, Jersey City. The financially unstable Montclair Railway went into receivership, and in 1875 became the Montclair and Greenwood Lake Railway In 1878 the company was re-organized as the New York and Greenwood Lake Railway (NYGL), under control of  Erie Railroad.

In 1887, the Erie created a new subsidiary, the Arlington Railroad, to create a new ROW in the Kearny Meadows which ran more directly to the WR Draw once the line had passed through the Long Dock Tunnel and crossed the Hackensack River. In 1889, it opened the DB Draw over the river, providing the company a modernized ROW from its Pavonia Terminal for use by both the NYGL and the Newark Branch, which crossed the Passaic on the NX Bridge at the southern end of Kearny. Within Erie, the NX was known as Bridge 8.04, which indicated the number of miles from the Jersey City waterfront terminal.  The WR Draw was known as Bridge 7.57.

In the mid-1890s, the Erie greatly expanded the infrastructure and service on the Greenwood Lake, taking over the Watchung Railway in 1895 and the Caldwell Railway and the Roseland Railway in 1897, the former becoming the Orange Branch and the latter two, the Caldwell Branch. The WR Draw was modified in 1911 when the Erie opened a new tunnel-cut, the Bergen Arches, in Jersey City, creating the Penhorn Creek Railroad to run through it and make connections to its lines on the west side of the Hudson Palisades. The bridge was again modified in the 1950s when New Jersey Route 21 was constructed under its west end.

In 1943, in a major re-organization, the New York and Greenwood Lake as well as other subsidiaries were absorbed into the Erie. In 1960 the Erie and the Delaware, Lackawanna, and Western (DL&W) merged, consolidating at Hoboken Terminal. In 1963, in conjunction with the construction of Interstate 80 in Paterson, the combined Erie Lackawanna Railroad's Boonton Line  was rerouted over the WR Draw.

Service over the bridge was diminished in phases. Numerous stations were taken out of use and the mainline was retracted in 1935. By 1966 service on the New York and Greenwood Lake was terminated. In 1976, the Erie-Lackawanna was taken over by Conrail which continued to run Boonton Line trains over the bridge.  New Jersey Transit Rail Operations (NJT) took over Conrail's commuter lines in 1983. With the 2002 opening of the Montclair Connection, NJT re-routed the Boonton Line to its Montclair Branch east of Montclair, thus bypassing the ROW to the bridge. Service was discontinued to Rowe Street, Benson Street and Arlington stations. DB Draw over the Hackensack River was also taken out of use and left in the open position. 

As of December 2022, the line is being converted to a rail trail.

See also
Timeline of Jersey City area railroads
List of crossings of the Lower Passaic River
List of bridges, tunnels, and cuts in Hudson County, New Jersey

References

Kearny, New Jersey
Erie Lackawanna Railway
Erie Railroad bridges
NJ Transit bridges
Bridges over the Passaic River
Railroad bridges in New Jersey
Transportation in Hudson County, New Jersey
Transportation in Newark, New Jersey
Bridges in Hudson County, New Jersey
Bridges in Newark, New Jersey
Bridges completed in 1897
Plate girder bridges in the United States